6th Massachusetts may refer to:

6th Massachusetts Regiment, a unit of infantry during the American Revolutionary War
6th Regiment Massachusetts Volunteer Militia, a 19th-century peacetime militia unit which saw active service during the American Civil War
6th Massachusetts Regiment (Spanish–American War), a unit of infantry during the Spanish–American War